Hatherley may refer to:

People
 Charlotte Hatherley (born 1979), a British guitarist
 Owen Hatherley (born 1981), a British academic and architecture journalist
 Baron Hatherley, a title in the peerage of the United Kingdom, held by William Wood, 1st Baron Hatherley

Places
 Up Hatherley, a district of Cheltenham, Gloucestershire
 Down Hatherley, a neighbouring village, Gloucestershire

Fiction
 Victor Hatherley, a character in The Adventure of the Engineer's Thumb, a Sherlock Holmes story by Arthur Conan Doyle